Willowbrook/Rosa Parks station (formerly Imperial/Wilmington/Rosa Parks station) is a major transport hub and Los Angeles Metro Rail station that serves the A Line and C Line.  The station, located at the intersection of Imperial Highway and Wilmington Avenue in the Willowbrook community of Los Angeles County, is a major transfer point for commuters.

As a major transfer station, Willowbrook/Rosa Parks Station also acts as a major bus hub, serving many bus routes operated by Metro and other regional/municipal transit agencies. The station also has park and ride facilities, including 975 parking spaces and 4 bike lockers. To the east of the station is the Metro Rail Operations Center, which is the dispatch hub for all Metro Rail train operators.

The station is located in unincorporated Willowbrook, near the Los Angeles community of Watts in the South Los Angeles region.  It is directly across the street from the Imperial Courts Housing Project, which is located within the City of Los Angeles. The C Line platform for this station is located in the middle of the I-105 Freeway.

The station's official name memorializes Rosa Parks, an important African-American civil rights activist. From the Blue (A) Line's opening on July 14, 1990 until the Green (C) Line opened on August 12, 1995 the Blue Line station platform was known as Imperial station while the Green Line station platform was planned to be called Wilmington station.

History 
A $10.25 million grant from the United States Department of Transportation in 2014 was used to partially fund $53 million in major upgrades to the station, including improved lighting,  new paintings,  new central plaza and extended platforms.

The Blue Line portion of the station was closed from January 26 to November 2, 2019 for a major renovation project as part of the New Blue Improvements Project.

Service

Station layout 

The A Line platform is on the street level, and the C Line platform is on the upper (freeway) level. The two levels are connected by stairs/escalators/elevators via a mezzanine. Ticket machines are located on street level and on the mezzanine.

A spur track connects the northbound A Line just south of the station to a pocket track on the C Line, allowing trains to transfer between the two lines when necessary, usually to allow C Line trains to access the A Line maintenance yard. This track is not used for revenue service.

Hours and frequency

Connections 
, the following connections are available:
GTrans (Gardena): 5
LADOT DASH: Watts
the Link: King Medical Center, Willowbrook Route A, Willowbrook Route B
Lynwood Breeze: D

Notable places nearby 
The station is within walking distance of the following notable places:
 King-Drew Medical Center
 King Drew Magnet High School of Medicine and Science
 Kenneth Hahn Plaza
 Verbum Dei High School

References

A Line (Los Angeles Metro) stations
C Line (Los Angeles Metro) stations
Willowbrook, California
South Los Angeles
Railway stations in the United States opened in 1990
1990 establishments in California
Memorials to Rosa Parks
Pacific Electric stations